Gideon Ofori Offei (born 11 January 1999) is a Ghanaian footballer who currently plays as a forward.

Career statistics

Club

Notes

References

1999 births
Living people
Ghanaian footballers
Ghanaian expatriate footballers
Association football forwards
Football League (Greece) players
Kategoria Superiore players
Kategoria e Parë players
Veria F.C. players
KF Tirana players
KF Bylis Ballsh players
Ebusua Dwarfs players
Ghanaian expatriate sportspeople in Greece
Expatriate footballers in Greece
Ghanaian expatriate sportspeople in Albania
Expatriate footballers in Albania